Library was established in 1969 known as the Library of the University of Penang at the Malayan Teachers College, Gelugor, Penang. Library was moved to Minden (temporary buildings) in 1971 and occupy the new building in 1979. Main Library 2 has been completed in 1994.

On December 10, 2004, the main campus library was named after the name of the First Vice Chancellor of Universiti Sains Malaysia, Tan Sri Hamzah Sendut. Currently, the library consists of three buildings named as Hamzah Sendut Library (PHS), Perpustakaan Hamzah Sendut 1 (PHS1), and Perpustakaan Hamzah Sendut 2 (PHS2).

Branches

 Main Branch: Perpustakaan Hamzah Sendut, Perpustakaan Hamzah Sendut 1, Perpustakaan Hamzah Sendut 2, Perpustakaan Pusat Islam, Perpustakaan PTPM, Pusat Sumber HBP
 Kelantan Branch: Perpustakaan Hamdan Tahir
 Nibong Tebal Branch: Perpustakaan Kejuruteraan
 PITM, Kepala Batas Branch: Pusat Ilmu Translasional dan Maklumat (IPPT)

External links
 Universiti Sains Malaysia
 Main Branch
 Kelantan Branch
 Nibong Tebal Branch
 PITM Branch
 Perpustakaan Universiti Sains Malaysia

Academic libraries in Malaysia
Universiti Sains Malaysia
Library buildings completed in 1979
Library buildings completed in 1994
1969 establishments in Malaysia